West Richmond railway station is located on the Mernda and Hurstbridge lines in Victoria, Australia. It serves the inner eastern Melbourne suburb of Richmond, and it opened on 21 October 1901.

The station opened along with the line from Princes Bridge to Collingwood.

Platforms and services

West Richmond has two side platforms. It is serviced by Metro Trains' Mernda and Hurstbridge line services.

Platform 1:
  all stations services to Flinders Street
  all stations services to Flinders Street

Platform 2:
  all stations services to Mernda
  all stations and limited express services to Macleod, Greensborough, Eltham and Hurstbridge

Transport links

Kinetic Melbourne operates one route via West Richmond station, under contract to Public Transport Victoria:
 : Elsternwick station – Clifton Hill

References

External links
 
 Melway map at street-directory.com.au

Railway stations in Melbourne
Railway stations in Australia opened in 1901
Railway stations in the City of Yarra